Larry Davies (1944 – 30 June 1997) was an Australian professional wrestler best known as Larry O'Dea. He was one half of the tag team known as "The Australians" with Ron Miller.

Larry made his professional wrestling debut in the 1960s for George Gardiner Promotions in Australia then soon left for New Zealand before joining World Championship Wrestling in 1964. In 1971 Davies started teaming up with Ron Miller as one-half of the tag team "The Australians" touring the United States and in 1973 he went on a tour of Japan with All Japan Pro Wrestling Davies became a co-owner of Australian wrestling company WCW Australia along with Ron Miller in 1974 up until 1978.

In 1980, he went back to New Zealand.

Davies had a match with his son, Jeff O'Day, at World Championship Wrestling's Clash of the Champions XIX as participants in a tag team tournament for the then vacant NWA World Tag Team Championship. They were eliminated in the first round by The Miracle Violence Connection (Steve Williams and Terry Gordy).

In December 1993, he wrestled a tour of India for Indo-Asian Wrestling.

Larry remained involved in the wrestling industry until his death from liver cancer on 30 June 1997.

Championships and accomplishments
All Star Pro Wrestling
NWA British Commonwealth Heavyweight Championship (New Zealand version) (2 times) 
NWA Australasian Tag Team Championship (1 time) - with Ripper Collins

Championship Wrestling from Florida
NWA Florida Tag Team Championship (4 times) - with Ron Miller

Gulf Coast Championship Wrestling
NWA Tennessee Tag Team Championship (1 time) - with Ron Miller

World Championship Wrestling (Australia)
NWA Austra-Asian Tag Team Championship (9 times) - with Ron Miller (4), Bobby Hart (2), Ed Wiskoski (1), Rick Martel (1) and Mario Milano (1)
NWA Austra-Asian Television Championship (1 time)
NWA Australia
Australian Heavyweight Championship (1 time)

References

Further reading
Miller, Ron. Interview by Barry York. "Interview with Ron Miller, professional wrestler and promoter." National Library of Australia. 19 Jan. 2000. CD-R.

External links
Larry O'Dea at OWW.com
Larry O'Dea at Cagematch.net
Larry O'Dea at KiwiProWrestling.co.nz

1944 births
1997 deaths
Professional wrestling executives
Australian male professional wrestlers
Sportsmen from New South Wales
Sportspeople from Sydney
20th-century professional wrestlers
NWA Florida Tag Team Champions
NWA Austra-Asian Tag Team Champions